İbecik is a village in the Gölhisar District of Burdur Province in Turkey. Its population is 675 (2021). Before the 2013 reorganisation, it was a town (belde).

References

Villages in Gölhisar District